Shandong IFC is a supertall skyscraper under construction in The Jinan Central Business District, Jinan, Shandong, China.

See also
 List of tallest buildings in China

References

Skyscrapers in Jinan
Skyscraper office buildings in China
Residential skyscrapers in China